Gigi Fernández and Natasha Zvereva were the defending champions, but lost in semifinals to Katrina Adams and Manon Bollegraf.

Katrina Adams and Manon Bollegraf won the title by defeating Conchita Martínez and Larisa Neiland 6–2, 4–6, 7–6(9–7) in the final.

Seeds

Draw

Draw

References

External links
 Official results archive (ITF)
 Official results archive (WTA)

Advanta Championships of Philadelphia
1993 WTA Tour